Valentin Pîntea (born 19 April 1962) is a Romanian gymnast. He competed at the 1984 Summer Olympics and the 1988 Summer Olympics.

References

1962 births
Living people
Romanian male artistic gymnasts
Olympic gymnasts of Romania
Gymnasts at the 1984 Summer Olympics
Gymnasts at the 1988 Summer Olympics
People from Lugoj